Germany participated in the ninth Winter Paralympics in Turin, Italy. 

Germany entered 35 athletes in the following sports:

Alpine skiing: 8 male, 4 female
Ice sledge hockey: 14 male
Nordic skiing: 8 male, 1 female

Medalists

See also
2006 Winter Paralympics
Germany at the 2006 Winter Olympics

External links
Torino 2006 Paralympic Games
International Paralympic Committee
Deutscher Behindertensportverband e.V.

2006
Nations at the 2006 Winter Paralympics
Winter Paralympics